BuyAutoParts.com is an auto parts retailer based in San Diego, California.  The company sells automotive repair and performance parts through its ecommerce website and over the phone. In 2012 they had sales of 32 million. Their CEO is Renee Thomas-Jacobs  and all of their 118 employees are based in the United States.

History
BuyAutoParts.com was founded in 1989 as a steering parts manufacturer and auto part distributor. In 2002 the company launched their website and by 2009 online sales made up half of total sales. Today the company receives 90 percent of its business from a targeted set of product lines, which include replacement turbochargers, air conditioning parts, steering racks,  and suspension components. The current CEO replaced co-founder Dara Greaney who left in 2016  Renee Jacobs took over in 2016.

Recognition
The firm was named to Inc. Magazine’s Inc.5000 fastest growing companies list for 2011 (#1803), 2012 (#1575), 2013 (#2382), 2014 (#3339) and 2015(#4463).Inc. listed their 3-year sales growth at 152%.  They earned the 'Five-Time Inc. 5000 Honoree' in 2015.  In 2013 the company was included on the Internet Retailer’s Top 500 Guide at position 422 and the San Diego Business Journal ranked them 75th in their 2013 Fastest Growing Company list, 82nd in their 2014 Fastest Growing Private Companies list and #97 in the 2015 list. They were ranked number 31 in the San Diego Business Journal list of largest private San Diego companies for 2015.

Headquarters
Company headquarters are located in San Diego, California. In 2012 they moved into a 55,000 square foot building which houses an inventory of 140,000 parts. As of March 2013 the company employed 118 people.

References

External links
BuyAutoParts Website

Companies based in San Diego
Online automotive companies of the United States